Mildred Ruiz-Sapp is an American actress. Born and raised on New York's Lower East Side (Alphabet City), she co-founded THE POINT Community Development Corporation (Hunts Point) in 1993 and Universes (poetic theatre ensemble) (1996), both in collaboration with Steven Sapp.

Theater Credits Include
Purgatory
Another I Dies Slowly
Live From the Edge
Slanguage
Blue Suite
Ameriville
Rhythmicity: Flipping The Script
One Shot In Lotus Position
The Ride
The Denver Project
UniSon

Television Credits Include

Film: Stay until Tomorrow by Laura Collela
Television: HBO's Def Poetry Jam (Season 4- Episode 9 (with UNIVERSES))

Awards/Affiliations
2008 Jazz at Lincoln Center Rhythm Road Tour; 
2008 TCG- Theatre Communications Group – Peter Zeisler Award; 
2002–2004 and 1999–2001 TCG- Theatre Communications Group National Theater Artist Residency Program Award; 
2002 BRIO Awards (Bronx Recognizes its own-Singing) from The Bronx Council on the Arts; 
1999 OBIE Award Grant (The Point CDC & Live From Theater Theater)
1999 Bessie Awards (The Point CDC)
1998 Union Square Award recipient
Co-Founder of The Point CDC; 
New York Theatre Workshop Usual Suspect; 
Board Member: National Performance Network
Former Board member: Network of Ensemble Theaters
Bard College, BA ’89.  
Publications: UNIVERSES-THE BIG BANG (2010 release- TCG Books); 
SLANGUAGE in The Fire This Time (TCG).

References

External links
Official site

Living people
American stage actresses
Year of birth missing (living people)
21st-century American women